Raúl Alberto Cubas Grau (born August 23, 1943) is a Paraguayan politician who served as the President of Paraguay from 1998 until his resignation in 1999.

Biography
Cubas Grau studied Engineering at the National University of Asunción.

He was a member of the Colorado Party.  Prior to standing for election, he worked as an electrical engineer, and served as Minister of Finance of Paraguay for a brief period in April 1996 until he resigned.

When the 1998 campaign began, army general Lino Oviedo named Cubas as his running mate.  However, a few months before the election, Oviedo was sentenced to 10 years in prison for his role in a 1996 coup and was disqualified.  Cubas took his place on the ballot and won the May 1998 election with 54% of the vote under the slogan "Cubas in government, Oviedo in power."  To date, it is the only time since the restoration of democracy in Paraguay that a presidential candidate has won an outright majority.

In June, the Paraguayan Congress passed a law that said that the president could not pardon anyone who had not served at least half of his or her prison term.  In August, however, three days after his inauguration, Cubas reduced Oviedo's sentence to the time already served, then released him from jail.  Despite an order from the Paraguayan Supreme Court in December 1998, Cubas refused to send Oviedo back to jail.  In response, the Chamber of Deputies voted to charge Cubas with abuse of power in February 1999.  The vote was only two votes short of that necessary for a formal impeachment.

Cubas' vice-president, Luis María Argaña, who had been named as Cubas' running mate to prevent the Colorados from losing power but was leading the anti-Oviedo bloc in the Colorado Party, was brutally murdered on March 23, 1999, allegedly as a result of a dispute over the Oviedo release.  His murder was allegedly done by a group with ties to Oviedo.  Cubas was implicated and protests broke out.  Thousands participated in public demonstrations led by striking workers, demanding that Cubas resign.  Security forces were called out.  Seven people were shot to death and dozens were injured when the demonstrations turned violent, in what became known as the Marzo paraguayo ("Paraguayan March").

Cubas' support virtually collapsed.  The day after the assassination, the Chamber of Deputies voted overwhelmingly to impeach Cubas.  Facing certain conviction and removal from office by the Senate, Cubas resigned on March 28, 1999 and fled to Brazil.  (A court later ordered Oviedo back to prison.)  He returned to Paraguay in 2002 and was immediately arrested and tried for conspiracy to murder Argaña. 

In October 2004, his daughter Cecilia Cubas was kidnapped by gunmen near her Asuncion apartment. Paraguayan security forces began an intense search for her, and Cubas paid a ransom of US$800,000.  However, her body was found in the basement of a house outside Asunción in February 2005. She was 32 years old.  Four men were arrested, including one with alleged ties to the Colombian rebel movement FARC. In July 2006, two suspects of the crime were granted refugee status in neighboring Bolivia.

References

External links
Cecila Cubas body found – MSNBC
 Biography by CIDOB

1943 births
Living people
People from Asunción
Universidad Nacional de Asunción alumni
Paraguayan engineers
Presidents of Paraguay
Finance Ministers of Paraguay
Colorado Party (Paraguay) politicians